The February 1875 Dublin University by-election was held on 11 February 1875. The by-election was held due to the incumbent Conservative MP, David Robert Plunket, becoming Solicitor General for Ireland. It was retained by the incumbent.

References

1875 elections in the United Kingdom
By-elections to the Parliament of the United Kingdom in Dublin University
Unopposed ministerial by-elections to the Parliament of the United Kingdom (need citation)
February 1875 events
1875 elections in Ireland